Lucas test may refer to

 Lucas primality test for primality of general numbers
 Lucas–Lehmer primality test for Mersenne primes
 Lucas' reagent, used to classify alcohols of low molecular weight